Rajacenna van Dam, who works under the name Rajacenna, is a Dutch hyper realistic pencil drawing artist.

As an actor, she played Remco's daughter for two episodes of the Dutch program  (later called Serious Crimes) and worked as a model and a TV host.  She began as a presenter of the first Dutch Web TV for children when she was 12 years.

When Rajacenna was 16 years old, she took up pencil drawing seriously, inspired by an Italian street artist. After three months her work was published in the art book Amazing Pencil Portraits 2. In 2012, she was published again in Amazing Pencil Portraits 3.

She was awarded by CosmoGirl "Born to Lead award" and she was awarded as one of the 400 most influential women in the Netherlands according to Viva magazine.

In May 2015, she worked with the band Owl City singer-songwriter Adam Young, for whom she made a promotional drawing and a time lapse video of the cover art of his album, Mobile Orchestra.

References

External links

Algemeen Dagblad Dutch Newspaper, "Lady Gaga vereeuwigd door Nederlands tekentalent", April 2010 
The Teenager Today. "Rajacenna, Pencil Ninja". May 2015
Kijkkez Jongerenmagazine, "17-jarige Rajacenna bij Viva 400 meest indrukwekkende vrouwen van Nederland", 2010
Weekkrant, May 27, 2015, "Rajacenna helpt Owl City zanger Adam Young"
Vlaardingen24.nl
Nieuwsbank.nl
Derestaurantkrant.nl
Tribunahoje.com
REUTERS. "Double Dutch: Artist draws with both hands at once". March 2019
New York Post. "The artist who draws with both hands at once: ‘It’s less boring’". March 2019
Algemeen Dagblad. "Brein van Rajacenna is zó bijzonder dat ze wetenschappers versteld laat staan". July 2022
Hart van Nederland. "Dankzij haar bijzondere brein maakt Rajacenna met twee handen tegelijk meerdere tekeningen". July 2022

Living people
Dutch artists
People from Vlaardingen
Year of birth missing (living people)